Radical 7 or radical two meaning "two" is one of 23 of the 214  Kangxi radicals that are composed of 2 strokes.
 
In the Kangxi Dictionary, there are 29 characters (out of 49,030) to be found under this radical.

In Simplified Chinese dictionaries and some Hong Kong Traditional Chinese dictionaries, radical 7 (radical two) is merged with radical 1 (Radical one).

Evolution

Derived characters

Literature 

Leyi Li: “Tracing the Roots of Chinese Characters: 500 Cases”. Beijing 1993,

See also
Chinese numerals

External links

Unihan Database - U+4E8C

007